Australian singer and songwriter Meg Mac has released three studio albums, two extended play, and seventeen singles (including one as a featured artist).

Albums

Extended plays

Singles

As lead artist

As featured artist

References

Discographies of Australian artists
Rhythm and blues discographies
Pop music discographies